Antonio Domingo Rojas Melero (born 22 March 1984 in Villarrobledo, Province of Albacete) is a Spanish footballer who plays as a centre forward.

External links

1984 births
Living people
Sportspeople from the Province of Albacete
Spanish footballers
Footballers from Castilla–La Mancha
Association football forwards
Segunda División players
Segunda División B players
Tercera División players
Sporting de Gijón B players
Sporting de Gijón players
Real Zaragoza B players
CD Ourense footballers
Real Murcia Imperial players
UE Lleida players
Ontinyent CF players
UD Las Palmas Atlético players
Villajoyosa CF footballers
Caravaca CF players
SD Lemona footballers
Caudal Deportivo footballers
CF Villanovense players